Rattlesnake Canyon stretches from Skofield Park into the Santa Ynez mountains. Its name comes from its serpentine shape and curves, not rattlesnake occupation.

History 
Around 1808, the Santa Barbara Mission received water from Mission Creek through an aqueduct that was made by the Chumash people . Through Las Canoas (The Flumes), water was funneled from Rattlesnake Canyon into Mission Creek. The native Chumash people helped dig the channel and build the flumes. In 1808, to build a more permanent structure, dams were built by Mexican artisans on Mission Creek and in Rattlesnake Canyon. Only remnants of the dam still exist, and the reservoir has been filled with sediment from the creek.

Later, in the 1920s, the entire canyon was owned by Ray Skofield, a wealthy New Yorker who had moved to Santa Barbara. His son Hobart Skofield planted many pines in the canyon in the early 1930s. In the Coyote Fire the trees burned down, but were replanted in 1966 by the Sierra Club. In 1970, Hobart Skofield sold the upper  of the canyon for $150,000, less than half of its value, to be made into a wilderness park, the Rattlesnake Canyon Wilderness Area.

External links 
 Information and photos

References 

 Redmon, Michael, Santa Barbara Independent, Tuesday, January 20,2015

Canyons and gorges of California
Landforms of Santa Barbara County, California
Protected areas of Santa Barbara County, California